Arena Sofia is a multi-purpose indoor arena located in Sofia, Bulgaria. Opened in July 2011, it has a seating capacity of 12,373. It was formerly called Arena Armeets after the Bulgarian insurance company Armeets purchased the naming rights, until the sponsorship was terminated in October 2022.

Designed as a universal hall for cultural events and sports, the arena could host up to 30 types of sports, including basketball, volleyball, handball, futsal, boxing, tennis, weightlifting, fencing and gymnastics competitions, as well as concerts with a maximum capacity of 17,906. There are 887 parking lots, 614 of them placed in a central exterior parking, 231 placed in near streets and 42 designated for disabled people.

Major events and notable firsts

The first major concert in the arena was held by Jean Michel Jarre, followed by artists Sade and Amorphis.

The arena has hosted the 2012 European Taekwon-do ITF championship in May, followed by the 2012 Aerobic Gymnastics World Championships in the first three days of June. The city was previously awarded the 2004 edition of the event.

During three days in February 2012 the arena hosted the Cirque du Soleil show Saltimbanco for the first time in Bulgaria. Between 9 and 11 November 2012 it also hosted the travelling ice show Disney on Ice, another debut for the country.

The Junior Eurovision Song Contest 2015 was held in the arena on 21 November 2015, the first time a Eurovision event was held in Bulgaria.

The arena recorded its first sold-out game on 9 June 2012, when 12,501 fans (128 more than the official capacity) came to see the Olympic qualification volleyball match between France and Bulgaria. It will be used for the 2020 FIBA Under-17 Basketball World Cup.

Bulgaria's ruling GERB party is a consistent user of the arena, having held its rallies and conferences within it for years. This trend was bucked during late 2019 Bulgarian local elections, as the party wanted to undertake a "humble" campaign.

List of major concerts

List of major sporting events

See also
 List of indoor arenas in Bulgaria

References

External links

Official website 
Official website 
List with actual events 

Indoor arenas in Bulgaria
Buildings and structures in Sofia
Sports venues in Sofia
Music venues in Bulgaria
Basketball venues in Bulgaria
Music venues completed in 2011
Sports venues completed in 2011